Tapirus copei, or Cope's tapir, is an extinct species of tapir that inhabited North America during the early to middle Pleistocene Epoch (~2.5–1 Ma). The fossil remains of two juvenile T. copei were collected in Hillsborough County, Florida on August 31, 1963. It was the second largest North American tapir; the first being T. merriami.

Taxonomy 
There are multiple pieces of evidence which indicate most, if not all, of the 5 accepted Pleistocene tapir species found in North America (T. californicus, T. haysii (T. copei), T. lundeliusi, T. merriami, T. veroensis) may actually belong to the same species. T. californicus was considered to be a subspecies of T. haysii by Merriam, T. californicus and T. veroensis are nearly impossible to distinguish morphologically and occupy the same time frame, being separated only by location, and T. haysii, T. veroensis, and T. lundeliusi are already considered so closely related that they occupy the same subgenus (Helicotapirus). Additionally, few details distinguish T. haysii and T. veroensis except size, date, and wear of teeth; and the intermediate sizes overlap greatly with many specimens originally assigned to one species, then later switched over to another.

References 

Prehistoric tapirs
Quaternary mammals of North America
Fossil taxa described in 1945